The 2019 Windsor and Maidenhead Borough Council election took place on Thursday 2 May 2019. That was the same day as other United Kingdom local elections in order to elect members of Windsor and Maidenhead Council in Berkshire, England. The whole council was up for election.

Before the election, the composition of the council was:

 Conservative 54
 Liberal Democrat 1
 Labour 0
 Independent 2

Background 
The Independent Local Government Boundary Commission for England carried out an electoral review of the Royal Borough with the view to change our electoral arrangements from May 2019. The Commission announced the number of councillors was to reduce and also looked into the number of wards, their names and boundaries. This reduced the number of councillors from 57 to 41.

Before the election, the composition of the council was:

After the election, the composition of the council became:

Summary

Election result

|-

Ward results

References 

2019 English local elections
Windsor and Maidenhead Borough Council elections